Twaddell's Mill and House, also known as Great Bend of the Brandywine and Big Bend, is a historic home and mill complex located at Chadds Ford Township, Delaware County, Pennsylvania. The property includes the main house, the foundation and part of the walls of a sawmill, root cellar, ice house, and spring house.

The main house is a 2 1/2 to -story bank house built of stone.  The house is unique because was built between 1810 and 1820, using mid-18th century building techniques.

Before occupation by Quaker settlers began, the land of the Great Bend was the location of the Lenape village known as Queonemysing (place of the long fish).

It was added to the National Register of Historic Places in 1973.

See also
George Alexis Weymouth

References

Houses on the National Register of Historic Places in Pennsylvania
Houses completed in 1820
Houses in Delaware County, Pennsylvania
National Register of Historic Places in Delaware County, Pennsylvania
Chadds Ford Township, Delaware County, Pennsylvania